Shadow Weaver is the 16th studio release, and 14th full-length studio album, by Christian alternative rock band the Choir, released on April 9, 2014. This album was funded by the band's original Kickstarter campaign launched in late 2013, which also generated the band's first Christmas release Peace, Love & Light. This was also the last studio album from the Choir to feature Marc Byrd.

The double-disc vinyl version of the album included a new studio recording of "Beautiful Girl," a track previously released as a digital single the prior year; with the inclusion of that track, Shadow Weaver is the longest studio album the band has released to date, at over an hour in length. In February 2017, the Choir reissued the entire album for free streaming and download via NoiseTrade, including commentary tracks for each song, the album version of "Beautiful Girl," and three additional bonus tracks.

Critical reception

Critical reaction to Shadow Weaver was widely favorable. Bert Saraco of CCM Magazine said the "shimmering guitars, reverb-drenched vocals and the signature wall of fuzz-box sound make this album a delight for long-time fans of The Choir," and in two reviews of Shadow Weaver from Jesus Freak Hideout, both Mark Rice and Bert Gangl agreed.  Rice said "this impeccably written, melancholy storm of emotion and experience is a poster child for quality," while Gangl added that "it's a great effort, period - and one which proves, yet again, that the muse that rendered the band so singularly poignant when they first made their debut in the mid-1980s, shines just as brightly here in the present day, some thirty years later." Apple Music's editorial review was even more effusive, claiming that Derri Daugherty's "angelic lead vocals are at once otherworldly and deeply human. If Shadow Weaver leans toward the melancholic, it’s a beautiful sadness that can melt the hardest heart."  While The Phantom Tollbooth awarded the band four out of five stars for the album, writer Derek Walker was a bit more critical, saying that "while some tracks show a new lease of energy, others (“Rhythm of the Road”) tend towards filler. Long-term fans may also question whether Daugherty is starting to recycle some tunes." Dw. Dunphy from PopDose disagreed, saying "let’s be clear that this is not just a monolith of feedback and reverb. With Byrd and Hindalong firmly in the mix, these are songs, not experiments. The offerings on the disc are well-rounded." Finally, John Thompson of True Tunes said of the Choir, "if you loved them in the 80s or 90s and have lost track, let this record be your re-introduction."

Track listing
All lyrics by Steve Hindalong.  All music by Derri Daugherty, Steve Hindalong and Marc Byrd, except where noted.

Personnel 
The Choir
Derri Daugherty – guitars, vocals
Steve Hindalong – drums, percussion
Tim Chandler – bass
Dan Michaels – sax, horns, lyricon
Marc Byrd – guitars, keys

Guest performers
Christine Glass (credited as Christy Byrd) – vocals
Tammy Bosley – vocals ("Shadow Weaver" and "Get Gone")
Ron Bosley – acoustic 12 string guitar ("Get Gone")
Jim Schreck – electric guitars ("White Knuckles" and "Shadow Weaver (Reprise)")
Sean Celli – electric guitars ("Everybody's Got a Guru" and "The Antithesis of Blue")
Thom Granger – bass drum, bell rope, wine glass ("Everybody's Got a Guru"), anvil ("Rhythm of the Road")
Andrew Thompson – harmonium ("Frequency of Light")

Production
 Derri Daugherty – producer
 Steve Hindalong – producer
 Marc Byrd – producer
 Sean Celli – executive producer
 Dan Michaels – executive producer
 Lisa Michaels – handler
 Chris Knight – photography
 Tom Gulotta – design, layout and additional art

References

2014 albums
The Choir (alternative rock band) albums
Galaxy21 Music albums
Kickstarter-funded albums